The 1999–2000 Liga Leumit season was the first in which Liga Leumit was Israeli football's second tier, following the establishment of the Israeli Premier League in the summer of 1999. Due to the ongoing restructuring, the league had only 10 clubs (expanded to 12 the next season as three clubs were relegated from the Premier League and only one promoted).

Maccabi Jaffa started the season in Liga Leumit, but a failure to have their budget approved by the Israel Football Association led to them being replaced by Bnei Sakhnin (who had finished 9th the previous season and had been relegated to the third tier) soon after the season started, with Maccabi Jaffa dropping into Liga Alef, the fourth tier. Jaffa's results were all annulled and Sakhnin took over their fixtures, replaying the ones Jaffa had already played.

Tzafririm Holon won the title and were promoted, whilst Hapoel Ashkelon finished bottom and were relegated to Liga Artzit. Holon's Danny Nir'on was the league's top scorer with 23 goals.

Final table

References
Israel Second Level 1999/2000 RSSSF
Previous seasons The Israel Football Association 

Liga Leumit seasons
Israel
2